Nikolay Timofeyevich Dementyev (27 July 1915 – 5 June 1994) was a Soviet and Russian football striker and a coach.

Career 
In 1929, he began his playing career in the team works S. Khalturin Factory in Leningrad. Then he performed in Leningrad clubs Dynamo, Spartak and DKA. In 1940 he moved to Dynamo Moscow. After the Great Patriotic War in 1946 he was a player of Spartak Leningrad. In 1954 he finished his playing career.

On 24 May 1952, he debuted in the representation of the Soviet Union in an unofficial match against Hungary (1–1). He played a total of 8 unofficial games for the USSR.

In 1956 he started his coaching. He first worked with youth in FSzM Moscow. From 1959, he helped train Spartak Moscow. In the years 1965–66 he managed Karpaty Lviv. Then again he helped train Spartak Moscow and Karpaty Lviv. In the years 1967–68 he led FC Shinnik Yaroslavl. From 1969 to 1983 he coached a club in Moscow. He was Champion of the USSR (1940, 1952, 1953) and USSR Cup winner (1946, 1947, 1950). In the USSR championships held 273 matches and scored 89 goals. He died on 5 June 1994 in Moscow.

Pyotr (Peka) Dementyev, also a footballer, was a brother of Nikolay.

References 

1915 births
1994 deaths
Footballers from Saint Petersburg
Honoured Masters of Sport of the USSR
Recipients of the Order of the Red Banner of Labour
FC Dynamo Moscow players
FC Dynamo Saint Petersburg players
FC Karpaty Lviv managers
FC Shinnik Yaroslavl managers
FC Spartak Moscow players
Russian footballers
Soviet bandy players
Soviet football managers
Soviet footballers
Soviet Top League players
Association football forwards

Burials at Vagankovo Cemetery